Noel Madison (born Noel Nathaniel Moscovitch; April 30, 1897 – January 6, 1975) was an American character actor in the 1930s and 1940s and appeared in 75 films, often as a gangster.

Born in New York City, Madison was the son of actor Maurice Moscovitch and his wife Rose.

Besides his theatrical work in the United States, he acted on stage in England and Australia.

Partial filmography

Sinners' Holiday (1930) - Buck
The Doorway to Hell (1930) - Rocco
Little Caesar (1931) - Killer Peppi (uncredited)
The Finger Points (1931) - Larry Hayes (scenes deleted)
The Star Witness (1931) - Horan - Henchman (uncredited)
The Hatchet Man (1932) - Charley Kee (uncredited)
Play Girl (1932) - Martie Happ
The Heart of New York (1932) - Mr. Farola - an Architect (uncredited)
Symphony of Six Million (1932) - Magnus Klauber
The Trial of Vivienne Ware (1932) - Angelo Paroni
Man About Town (1932) - Tony (uncredited)
Radio Patrol (1932) - Tony
The Last Mile (1932) - D'Amoro - Cell 6
Hat Check Girl (1932) - Dan McCoy (uncredited)
Me and My Gal (1932) - Baby Face Castenega
Laughter in Hell (1933) - Brownfield
West of Singapore (1933) - Degama
Humanity (1933) - Sam Bernstein
Destination Unknown (1933) - Maxie
The Important Witness (1933) - Gus Miranda
Journal of a Crime (1934) - Costelli
The House of Rothschild (1934) - Carl Rothschild
I Like It That Way (1934) - Jimmy Stuart
Manhattan Melodrama (1934) - Manny Arnold
The Cat's-Paw (1934) - Gangster (uncredited)
The Girl from Missouri (1934) - Mr. Miller (uncredited)
Times Square Lady (1935) - (scenes deleted)
Four Hours to Kill! (1935) - Anderson
G Men (1935) - Durfee
What Price Crime (1935) - Douglas Worthington
The Girl Who Came Back (1935) - Brewster
Woman Wanted (1935) - Joe Metz
Three Kids and a Queen (1935) - Stanley
The Pace That Kills (1935) - Nick - The Pusher
The Morals of Marcus (1935) - Tony Pasquale
My Marriage (1936) - Marty Harris
Muss 'em Up (1936) - Tony Spivali - Gambler
Murder at Glen Athol (1936) - Gus Colleti
Champagne Charlie (1936) - Pedro Gorini
Easy Money (1936) - 'Duke' Trotti
Straight from the Shoulder (1936) - Trim
Missing Girls (1936) - Ben Davis
Our Relations (1936) - Second Gangster at Pirate's Club
House of Secrets (1936) - Dan Wharton
Man of the People (1937) - 'Dopey' Benny
Her Husband Lies (1937) - Jackie Taylor (uncredited)
The Man Who Made Diamonds (1937) - Joseph
Gangway (1937) - Mike Otterman
Nation Aflame (1937) - Frank Sandino
Sailing Along (1938) - Windy
Kate Plus Ten (1938, aka Queen of Crime) - Gregori
Crackerjack (1938) - Sculpie
Climbing High (1938) - Gibson
Anything to Declare? (1938) - Dr. Klee
Missing Evidence (1939) - Paul Duncan
Charlie Chan in City in Darkness (1939) - Belescu
The Great Plane Robbery (1940) - Joe Colson
Footsteps in the Dark (1941) - Fissue
Ellery Queen's Penthouse Mystery (1941) - Gordon Cobb
A Shot in the Dark (1941) - Al Martin
 Highway West (1941) - Salvo - Henchman
A Tragedy at Midnight (1942) - Ricci (uncredited)
Joe Smith, American (1942) - Schricker
Secret Agent of Japan (1942) - Saito
A Desperate Chance for Ellery Queen (1942) - George Belden
Bombs over Burma (1942) - Me-Hoi
Miss V from Moscow (1942) - Police Chief Fritz Kleiss
Forever and a Day (1943) - Mr. Dunkinfield (uncredited)
Shantytown (1943) - 'Ace' Lambert
The Black Raven (1943) - Mike Bardoni
Jitterbugs (1943) - Tony Queen
The Gentleman from Nowhere (1948) - Vincent Sawyer (final film role)

References

External links

 

1897 births
1975 deaths
American male film actors
Male actors from New York City
20th-century American male actors
American male stage actors
American people of Russian-Jewish descent
Jewish American male actors
20th-century American Jews